Euzophera speculum is a species of snout moth in the genus Euzophera. It was described by Joseph de Joannis in 1927 and is known from Mozambique.

References

Endemic fauna of Mozambique
Snout moths of Africa
Moths of Africa
Moths described in 1927